Lago di Caldonazzo is a lake in Trentino, Italy. At an elevation of 449 m, its surface area is 5.38 km². It is located in the valley communities of Alta Valsugana e Bersntol.

Water sports like the canoe, the sail, wind surfing and water skiing is famous on the lake. The lake has played an important role; it was, and still is, the "training ground" for Thomas Degasperi, water skier Trentino specialist in the discipline slalom, current European and world champion.

Events
Many events take place on the lake, especially during the summer.

 The most important is the Palio dei Draghi or Dragon Boat, a competition between boats driven by many rowers. The boats are vaguely reminiscent of the shape of dragons, hence the name of the race.
 Every year on August 14, a fireworks display is organised to celebrate Ferragosto.
 National Youth of canoe is hosted every year in the last weekend of August.

Lakes of Trentino-Alto Adige/Südtirol